The Burrell College of Osteopathic Medicine at New Mexico State University is a private, for-profit medical school on the New Mexico State University campus in Las Cruces, New Mexico. It is accredited by the American Osteopathic Association's Commission on Osteopathic College Accreditation and graduated its first class in May 2020.

History
The Burrell College of Osteopathic Medicine at New Mexico State University (BCOM) was founded in 2013, at a cost of $85 million. The Burrell College of Osteopathic Medicine was envisioned by its Founding Dean George Mychaskiw, D.O., to address the shortage of physicians in the Southwestern United States and its border with Northern Mexico, as well as to diversify the physician workforce. Dr. Mychaskiw reached out to John Hummer, a New Mexico business and healthcare leader, for his assistance in pursuing this vision. Co-founders George Mychaskiw and John Hummer formed a partnership and met with NMSU in July 2013 and incorporated a new legal entity, The New Mexico College of Osteopathic Medicine, that would eventually be named the Burrell College of Osteopathic Medicine. The two co-founders orchestrated a synergistic gathering of influential leaders, in both the higher education and healthcare sectors, to assist in making the vision a reality. New Mexico State University (NMSU) Chancellor Garrey Carruthers supported their vision for the creation of a private/public affiliated osteopathic medical school in Las Cruces, New Mexico. John Hummer introduced the medical school to Dan Burrell who then joined Mychaskiw and Hummer as a co-founder. Burrell provided the initial seed funding; thus the medical school’s namesake in honor of his family. Rice University, via the Rice Management Company, who oversees and manages their endowment, became the single largest shareholder. BCOM was founded as a for-profit school in partnership with New Mexico State University. BCOM was granted applicant status in 2012 by the American Osteopathic Association, and ultimately received provisional accreditation in July 2015.  BCOM began its first courses in August 2016. Don N. Peska, DO, MEd, FACOS became Interim Dean and Chief Academic Officer in 2018 and was succeeded by William Pieratt, DO as the new Dean in 2020.  As of 2015, the school had received over $110 million from private investors. BCOM is the first osteopathic medical school in New Mexico, and the second medical school in the state. 

On May 8, 2020, the inaugural class of 2020 graduated, earning the Doctor of Osteopathic Medicine degree.

Academics

BCOM offers the Doctor of Osteopathic Medicine (DO) degree. Years 1 and 2 of the DO program consist primarily of classroom-based learning, with students completing clinical clerkships during years 3 and 4 at one of five primary sites: Las Cruces, Albuquerque, Eastern New Mexico, El Paso, Texas, or Tucson, Arizona. As of 2021 clinical clerkship sites also include: Four Corners primarily in New Mexico and Rockledge, Florida.

Honor Societies
Burrell College has a number of honor societies active on its campus including: Sigma Sigma Phi, Gold Humanism Honor Society, and Omega Beta Iota.

Campus
BCOM's campus consists of a newly constructed 80,000 square foot, three story building located in the Arrowhead Research Park on the NMSU campus which is located next to the New Mexico State University (NMSU) football stadium.  Students at BCOM may access all of the campus facilities and resources at NMSU, and may opt to live in student housing. The school is located around an hour away from White Sands National Park and Spaceport America.

Graduate medical education
BCOM has facilitated the opening of over 100 new graduate medical education (GME) residency positions in family medicine, internal medicine, orthopedic surgery, and osteopathic neuromuscular medicine.

See also
 List of medical schools in the United States

References

External links
Official website

Osteopathic medical schools in the United States
Educational institutions established in 2013
Las Cruces, New Mexico
2013 establishments in New Mexico
Private universities and colleges in New Mexico